The Brown County Reforestation Camp is an area of almost  located in Brown County, Wisconsin. It has many trails and picnic areas, and is often used as a winter recreation area.

External links
Brown County Parks 
Brown County, Wisconsin
Some history of the camp

Protected areas of Brown County, Wisconsin
Parks in Wisconsin
Forests of Wisconsin